Peter Corterier (19 June 1936 – 22 February 2017) was a German politician of the Social Democratic Party (SPD) and former member of the German Bundestag.

Life 
From 1969 to 1983 Corterier was a member of the German Bundestag. On 13 June 1984, he succeeded Rainer Offergeld, who had left the Bundestag, as a substitute for him, and remained a member of the Bundestag until 1987. Peter Corterier entered the Bundestag in 1976 and 1984 via the Baden-Württemberg state list and otherwise always as a directly elected member of parliament for the Karlsruhe constituency.

From 1973 to 1977 Corterier was also a member of the European Parliament.

References

Literature 

1936 births
2017 deaths
Members of the Bundestag for Baden-Württemberg
Members of the Bundestag 1983–1987
Members of the Bundestag 1980–1983
Members of the Bundestag 1976–1980
Members of the Bundestag 1972–1976
Members of the Bundestag 1969–1972
Members of the Bundestag for the Social Democratic Party of Germany
Parliamentary State Secretaries of Germany
Social Democratic Party of Germany MEPs
MEPs for Germany 1958–1979